Steppin' with the World Saxophone Quartet is an  album by the jazz group the World Saxophone Quartet released on the Italian Black Saint label in 1979. The album features performances by Hamiet Bluiett, Julius Hemphill, Oliver Lake and David Murray.

Reception

The AllMusic review  by Scott Yanow awarded the album 4½ stars, stating, "The second recording by The World Saxophone Quartet (which follows by a year their Moers Music release Point of No Return) gives one a well-rounded look at this powerful group. Composed of altoist Julius Hemphill (who contributes four of the six group originals), altoist Oliver Lake, tenorman David Murray and baritonist Hamiet Bluiett, the explorative yet rhythmic group is heard in their early prime on this stimulating release".

In an article for The New York Times, Robert Palmer wrote: "Each of the pieces on Steppin' is a vivid and complete statement with a sound and direction of its own... Throughout, the quartet demonstrates that the musicians know exactly what they are doing."

Track listing
 "Steppin'" (Hemphill) - 9:06  
 "Ra-Ta-Ta" (Lake) - 5:26  
 "Dream Scheme" (Hemphill) - 7:18  
 "P.O. in Cairo" (Murray) - 10:47  
 "Hearts" (Hemphill) - 3:01  
 "R&B" (Hemphill) - 8:39

Personnel
Hamiet Bluiett — baritone saxophone
Julius Hemphill — alto saxophone
Oliver Lake — alto saxophone
David Murray — tenor saxophone

References

1979 albums
Black Saint/Soul Note albums
World Saxophone Quartet albums